Mr Midnight (US title: Mr. Midnight) is a children's horror fiction book series written by Jim Aitchison under the pseudonym of James Lee. The series is published by Angsana Books, Flame Of The Forest Publishing. There are currently 130 books in the series, including 27 Special Edition titles, with more being written and released around every two to four months. It has been translated into Burmese, Malay, Indonesian, simplified Chinese, and traditional Chinese.

Each book in the series contains two stories. The first book was titled Madman's Mansion and The Monster In Mahima's Mirror.

James Lee's books are very popular among young children and preteens and have been regarded as "Asia's answer to Harry Potter".

In 2020, the series hit a milestone when it released Mr Midnight #100 — the 100th title in the series excluding Special Editions.

Author 
James Lee is the author of the series. He has been writing since 1998.

Books 
The latest book in the Mr Midnight book series is Mr Midnight #103. It contains two story, My Ghost Positioning System and Vampires, Vampires, Vampires!.

Netflix series 

In February 2015, a promotional image for a new Mr Midnight television series was posted on the Mr Midnight Facebook page. It featured a Mr Midnight logo with a pair of eyes peeking out from behind the logo. The caption underneath the logo read, "The hit book series that has scared thousands of kids across Asia is coming to television!" Any other details about the upcoming series were unknown, except that the series would most likely be adaptations of the stories.

However, an update was finally released by the publisher on Instagram and Facebook in late September 2022 with the announcement that the TV series, produced by Beach House Pictures, would be released on Netflix to a worldwide audience. Titled Mr. Midnight: Beware the Monsters, the series premiered on 24 October 2022.

Movie 
A movie  titled Mr. Midnight the Movie: My Haunted Holiday was in the works but was cancelled as the producers thought the movie would not suit the book's style.

References

External links
 Mr Midnight on the Flame Of The Forest website 

Singaporean short story collections
Works published under a pseudonym
Singaporean children's literature
Series of children's books